Jonas Junias Jonas (born 24 November 1993 in Swakopmund) is a Namibian boxer and a participant in the 2016 Summer Olympics.

Career
Jonas attended Vrederede Primary School, Atlantic Junior Secondary and SI Gobs Secondary School, he gained fame in 2014, when he won a silver medal at the Commonwealth Games at the age of 20. In the process he became only the fourth Namibian boxer to win a medal at the Commonwealth Games.

He competed in the men's light welterweight class at the 2016 Summer Olympics in Rio de Janeiro. He was defeated by Hassan Amzile of France in the round of 32. He was the flagbearer for Namibia during the Parade of Nations.

References

1993 births
Living people
Commonwealth Games gold medallists for Namibia
Commonwealth Games silver medallists for Namibia
Boxers at the 2014 Commonwealth Games
Boxers at the 2018 Commonwealth Games
Olympic boxers of Namibia
Boxers at the 2016 Summer Olympics
Sportspeople from Swakopmund
Namibian male boxers
Commonwealth Games medallists in boxing
African Games medalists in boxing
African Games silver medalists for Namibia
African Games bronze medalists for Namibia
Competitors at the 2015 African Games
Competitors at the 2019 African Games
Light-welterweight boxers
Boxers at the 2020 Summer Olympics
Medallists at the 2018 Commonwealth Games